Cao Chunan (August 15, 1930 – August 27, 2020) was a Chinese scientist who specialized in corrosion and electrochemistry. He was a member of the Jiusan Society.

Biography
Cao was born in Changshu County (now Zhangjiagang), Jiangsu, on August 15, 1930. He had five brothers. He secondary studied at Liangfeng High School. In 1948, he was accepted to Tongji University, where he majored in chemistry. After graduation, he was assigned to the CAS Shanghai Branch, in 1952, becoming associate research fellow in 1979 and dean and research fellow in 1982. In 1987, he was transferred to the Institute of Metal Research. He became a professor at Zhejiang University in 1994. In 1999, he concurrently served as dean of College of Environment and Resources, Zhejiang University. He died of illness in Hangzhou, Zhejiang, on August 27, 2020.

Works

Papers

Honours and awards
 1985 May 1st Labor Medal
 1991 Member of the Chinese Academy of Sciences (CAS)

References

1930 births
2020 deaths
People from Changshu
Scientists from Zhejiang
Tongji University alumni
Academic staff of Zhejiang University
Members of the Chinese Academy of Sciences